Charles Henry Whyting (1812 – 23 April 1866) was an English cricketer. Whyting's batting style is unknown.

Whyting made his debut in first-class cricket when he was selected to play for the Gentlemen in the Gentlemen v Players fixture of 1837 at Lord's. He made a second appearance in first-class cricket in 1839 at Lord's for Surrey against the Marylebone Cricket Club. He scored a total of 17 runs in his two matches, with a highest score of 14 not out.

He died at Walworth, Surrey on 23 April 1866. His brother George Whyting was also a first-class cricketer.

References

External links
Charles Whyting at ESPNcricinfo
Charles Whyting at CricketArchive

1812 births
1866 deaths
English cricketers
Gentlemen cricketers
Surrey cricketers